Martin Bejerano is an American jazz pianist, composer, arranger, and educator.

Life and career
Bejerano was born in Miami, Florida, and is of Afro-Cuban heritage. He graduated from the New World School of the Arts at Florida State University and obtained a master's degree in jazz piano performance from the University of Miami. He joined drummer Roy Haynes' band around 2000, and guitarist Russell Malone's quartet in 2002.

Bejerano's first album as leader, Evolution/Revolution, was released in 2007. The Penguin Guide to Jazz commented that there was a "classical sumptuousness in his work, though in jazz terms he is most obviously influenced by Chick Corea". In 2010, Bejerano was awarded a Chamber Music America commission for a new jazz work.

Bejerano has cited as influences a number of rock and pop bands and classical music composers and performers, as well as jazz musicians including pianists Corea, Herbie Hancock, and Keith Jarrett. Bejerano is an assistant professor of jazz piano at the Frost School of Music at the University of Miami.

Discography
An asterisk (*) indicates that the year is that of release.

As leader/co-leader

As sideman

References

Living people
American jazz pianists
American male pianists
21st-century American pianists
21st-century American male musicians
American male jazz musicians
Year of birth missing (living people)